Billy Jack is honeyhoney's second studio album, released on Oct 24, 2011 under their own honeyhoney Records/Lost Highway label.

Track list

Charts

References

2011 albums